Gilman/Paul station is a light rail station on the Muni Metro T Third Street line, located in the median of Third Street in the Bayview neighborhood of San Francisco, California. The station opened with the T Third Street line on January 13, 2007. It has two side platforms; the northbound platform is north of Gilman Avenue/Paul Avenue, and the southbound platform to the south, so that trains can pass through the intersection before the station stop.

References

External links 
SFMTA: Third Street & Gilman/Paul northbound, southbound
SF Bay Transit (unofficial): Third Street/Gilman/Paul

Muni Metro stations
Railway stations in the United States opened in 2007
2007 establishments in California